Kimsa Qaqa  (Quechua kimsa three, qaqa rock, "three rocks", Hispanicized spelling Quimsajaja) is a group of three mountains in the Wansu mountain range in the Andes of Peru, about  high. It is located in the Arequipa Region, La Unión Province, Pampamarca District. The three peaks of Kimsa Qaqa lie in a row from southwest to northeast, southeast of Qarwa K'uchu.

References 

Mountains of Peru
Mountains of Arequipa Region